The Men's 10,000 metres event featured at the 2003 World Championships in Paris, France. The final was held on 24 August 2003.

At this point in time, Haile Gebrselassie was the #1 distance runner in the world, with two successive Olympic titles and four World Championships at 10,000.  He also held the 5-year-old world record plus the world record at 5,000 metres.  A poor race at the previous World Championships was the first sign of his lack of total dominance, now the 30 year old had a challenger from near his home town, who also ran with an almost identical, efficient running form, 21 year old Kenenisa Bekele.  As Gebrselassie ran a strong race trying to burn off his new rival, the rest of the world's best runners, including five Kenyan born athletes, disappeared in their wake.  The last to hold on to the lead group was Sileshi Sihine, assuring an Ethiopian sweep, but the championship was in doubt. Bekele remained as Gebrselassie's twin shadow until he made one move with 200 metres to go.  Gebrselassie's ever powerful sprint was no match for Bekele.  Over the final straightaway, Bekele extended to more than a full second gap for the victory and the changing of the guard in dominance of long distance track running.  Bekele took the prize at the next Olympics over Sihine with Gebrselassie out of the money and accomplished the Woolworth double (5 and 10) in 2008.  Gebrselassie subsequently focused his effort onto 10k, half-marathon and marathon competitions, setting multiple world records before retiring.

Final ranking

See also
Athletics at the 2003 Pan American Games - Men's 10000 metres

References
 

Events at the 2003 World Championships in Athletics
10,000 metres at the World Athletics Championships